Anentome is a genus of freshwater snails with opercula, aquatic gastropod mollusks in the subfamily Anentominae of the family Nassariidae, a family, almost all of the rest of which are marine.

Species  
Species within the genus Anentome include:
 Anentome bizonata (Deshayes, 1876)
 Anentome cambojiensis (Reeve, 1861)
 Anentome costulata (Schepman, 1885)
 Anentome fusca (H. Adams, 1862)
 Anentome helena (von dem Busch, 1847)
 Anentome jullieni (Deshayes, 1876)
 Anentome paviei (Morlet, 1866)
 Anentome scalarina (Deshayes, 1876)
 Anentome spinosa (Temcharoen, 1971)
 Anentome wykoffi (Brandt, 1974)

References

External links 
 Adams, H. (1862 ["1861"]). Descriptions of some new genera and species of shells from the collection of Hugh Cuming, Esq. Proceedings of the Zoological Society of London. 1861(3): 383-385
 Strong E.E., Galindo L.A. & Kantor Yu.I. (2017). Quid est Clea helena? Evidence for a previously unrecognized radiation of assassin snails (Gastropoda: Buccinoidea: Nassariidae). PeerJ. 5: e3638
 Galindo, L. A.; Puillandre, N.; Utge, J.; Lozouet, P.; Bouchet, P. (2016). The phylogeny and systematics of the Nassariidae revisited (Gastropoda, Buccinoidea). Molecular Phylogenetics and Evolution. 99: 337-353

Nassariidae
Gastropod genera